Rive droite, rive gauche (also known as "Right Bank, Left Bank") is a French film directed by Philippe Labro, starring  Gérard Depardieu, Nathalie Baye and Carole Bouquet. Bouquet received Best Supporting Actress nomination.

Plot 
Paul is a successful lawyer from the right bank of the Seine. Among others he represents the investor Pervillard. In spite of being married Paul falls in love with a young lady named Sacha. When he learns she got sacked because she wouldn't let Pervillard molest her, he makes her case public. Sacha proves him her appreciation but now she has to fear the wrath of Paul's jealous wife Babée.

Cast 
 Gérard Depardieu: Paul Senanques
 Nathalie Baye: Sacha
 Carole Bouquet: Babée Senanques
 Bernard Fresson: Pervillard
 Jacques Weber: Garry, Senanques' business Partner
 Charlotte de Turckheim: Catherine
 Jacques Boudet: The Minister
 Philippe Laudenbach: The Host
 Jean-Yves Berteloot: A doctor
 Marcel Bozonnet: Pervillard's friend

References

External links 
 
 

1984 films
French crime drama films
1980s legal films
1980s French films